Events in the year 2019 in Benin.

Incumbents
President: Patrice Talon
President of the National Assembly: Adrien Houngbédji (until 18 May); Louis Vlavonou (from 18 May)

Events

28 April – 2019 Beninese parliamentary election

Deaths

21 March – Paul Kouassivi Vieira, Roman Catholic prelate (b. 1949).
22 October – Bachirou Osséni, footballer (b. 1985).
6 November – Albert Tévoédjrè, writer and politician (b. 1929).
12 November – Basile Adjou Moumouni, physician (b. 1922).

References

 
2010s in Benin
Years of the 21st century in Benin
Benin
Benin